Anthology of Twentieth-Century British and Irish Poetry is a poetry anthology edited by Keith Tuma, and published in 2001 by Oxford University Press. Tuma is an American academic, and author of the somewhat despairing Fishing by Obstinate Isles: Modern and Postmodern British Poetry and American Readers (1998), on the topic of the perceived gap between 'mainstream' British poetry and the possible American reception (particularly in academia). The choice of poets (it, clearly enough, operating at the level of poets as much as poems) is therefore some gesture at remedying a gulf supposed to have opened when Ezra Pound left London for Paris.

Poets in Anthology of Twentieth-Century British and Irish Poetry

 Fleur Adcock
 Moniza Alvi
 W. H. Auden
 Samuel Beckett
 Asa Benveniste
 Caroline Bergvall
 James Berry
 Eavan Boland
 Jean "Binta" Breeze
 Basil Bunting
 Mary Butts
 Brian Catling
 cris cheek
 Austin Clarke
 Bob Cobbing
 Brian Coffey
 Andrew Crozier
 Nancy Cunard
 David Dabydeen
 Elizabeth Daryush
 Donald Davie
 Walter de la Mare
 Denis Devlin
 Keith Douglas
 Carol Ann Duffy
 T. S. Eliot
 William Empson
 Elaine Feinstein
 Ian Hamilton Finlay
 Allen Fisher
 Ford Madox Ford
 Veronica Forrest-Thomson

 David Gascoyne
 W. S. Graham
 Robert Graves
 Bill Griffiths
 Thom Gunn
 Ivor Gurney
 Alan Halsey
 Thomas Hardy
 Tony Harrison
 Lee Harwood
 Randolph Healy
 Seamus Heaney
 W. N. Herbert
 F. R. Higgins
 Geoffrey Hill
 Gerard Manley Hopkins
 Ted Hughes
 T. E. Hulme
 John James
 Elizabeth Jennings
 Linton Kwesi Johnson
 David Jones
 Trevor Joyce
 Patrick Kavanagh
 Jackie Kay
 Thomas Kinsella
 Rudyard Kipling
 Frank Kuppner
 R. F. Langley
 Philip Larkin
 D. H. Lawrence
 Tom Leonard

 Liz Lochhead
 Tony Lopez
 Mina Loy
 Norman MacCaig
 Hugh MacDiarmid
 Helen Macdonald
 Somhairle MacGill-Eain
 Thomas MacGreevy
 Sorley Maclean
 Joseph Gordon Macleod
 Louis MacNeice
 Barry MacSweeney
 Charles Madge
 Derek Mahon
 E. A. Markham
 Medbh McGuckian
 Charlotte Mew
 Christopher Middleton
 Drew Milne
 Geraldine Monk
 Harold Monro
 John Montague
 Nicholas Moore
 Edwin Muir
 Paul Muldoon
 Grace Nichols
 Maggie O'Sullivan
 Wilfred Owen
 Clere Parsons
 Tom Pickard
 F. T. Prince

 Craig Raine
 Tom Raworth
 Peter Reading
 Peter Redgrove
 Carlyle Reedy
 Denise Riley
 John Riley
 Peter Riley
 Lynette Roberts
 John Rodker
 Isaac Rosenberg
 Siegfried Sassoon
 Tom Scott
 Maurice Scully
 Jo Shapcott
 Robert Sheppard
 Jon Silkin
 C. H. Sisson
 Edith Sitwell
 Stevie Smith
 Dylan Thomas
 Edward Thomas
 Charles Tomlinson
 Rosemary Tonks
 Gael Turnbull
 Catherine Walsh
 Sylvia Townsend Warner
 Anna Wickham
 John Wilkinson
 W. B. Yeats
 Benjamin Zephaniah

(A note in the book's introduction indicates that J. H. Prynne was originally included in the anthology but had to be omitted because of the author's refusal of permission.)

See also
 2001 in poetry
 2001 in literature
 List of poetry anthologies
 English poetry
 Irish poetry

2001 poetry books
2001 anthologies
British poetry anthologies
Irish poetry anthologies
Twentieth-Century